Eduard Mammadov (born January 2, 1978, in Baku) is an Azerbaijani kickboxer, nicknamed the "White Wolf". He is a current fourteen times World Association of Kickboxing Organizations World Heavyweight Low Kick Champion and the European World Kickboxing Heavyweight Champion.

Kickboxing career
Mammadov started his professional kickboxing career in 1993 and since then won all Azerbaijani Kickboxing Championship titles.

Coaching career
He started his coaching career in 2000 and currently working as kickboxing coach in local school.

Titles

Eduard has won 25 world titles, 7 European titles and been champion of Azerbaijan 15 times.

Professional
W.A.K.O Pro world champion

Amateur
2009 W.P.K.A. World Championships in Madrid, Spain  -60 kg (K-1 Rules)
2009 W.P.K.A. World Championships in Madrid, Spain  -60 kg (Low-Kick)
2007 W.A.K.O. World Championships in Coimbra, Portugal  -60 kg (Full-Contact)
2007 W.A.K.O. World Championships in Belgrade, Serbia  -60 kg (Low-Kick)
2006 W.A.K.O. European Championships in Skopje, Macedonia  -60 kg (Low-Kick)
2005 W.A.K.O. World Championships in Agadir, Morocco  -60 kg (Low-Kick) 
2002 W.A.K.O. European Championships in Jesolo, Italy  -60 kg (Low-Kick)
2001 W.A.K.O. World Championships in Belgrade, Serbia & Montenegro  -57 kg (Full-Contact)

See also
 List of heavyweight boxing champions
 List of male kickboxers

References

External links
Eduard Mammadov Official Website 

1978 births
Living people
Azerbaijani male kickboxers
Welterweight kickboxers
Sportspeople from Baku
21st-century Azerbaijani people